Michael Vang (born May 13, 2000) is a professional footballer who plays as a midfielder for MLS Next Pro club Portland Timbers 2. Born in the United States, he represents Laos internationally.

Playing career

Youth
Vang played in the U.S. Soccer Development Academy through Shattuck-Saint Mary's in high school.

Vang was committed to play soccer for the University of the Pacific, but decided instead to pursue playing professionally.

Professional
In 2018, Vang went to Portugal to play for S.U. 1º de Dezembro of the Campeonato de Portugal. Vang reached the first team in 2019 and started three league games.

Vang signed with Forward Madison FC of USL League One prior to the 2020 season.

On February 18, 2022, Vang joined Columbus Crew 2, the reserve side of Major League Soccer's Columbus Crew, ahead of their inaugural MLS Next Pro season. He made 22 appearances for the team and scored two goals, but was released at the end of the season. Vang signed with Portland Timbers 2 of MLS Next Pro, the reserve side of the Portland Timbers, in March 2023.

Personal life
Vang became the first Hmong professional soccer player in the United States. He is also of Laotian descent through his father.

Honors
Columbus Crew 2
MLS Next Pro: 2022

References

External links
 

2000 births
Living people
American soccer players
Association football midfielders
Forward Madison FC players
Soccer players from Minnesota
Sportspeople from Saint Paul, Minnesota
USL League One players
Campeonato de Portugal (league) players
American expatriate soccer players
American expatriate sportspeople in Portugal
Expatriate footballers in Portugal
American people of Hmong descent
American people of Laotian descent
Columbus Crew 2 players
MLS Next Pro players
Portland Timbers 2 players